Posey Township is one of twelve townships in Harrison County, Indiana. As of the 2010 census, its population was 2,909 and it contained 1,230 housing units.

History

Posey township was named for Territorial Governor Thomas Posey.

The first settlers entered Posey Township in 1807. There were David and  Joshua Farnsley in the north central part, Jacob Lutz and William Smith in the southeast along the Ohio, and General W. Johnson in the southwest, near present-day Rogers Campground.

Elizabeth was platted in 1812 making it the second oldest town in the county.

In 1998, Caesars Southern Indiana opened in Posey township near Bridgeport.

Geography

References

External links
 Indiana Township Association
 United Township Association of Indiana

Townships in Harrison County, Indiana
Townships in Indiana